|}

The Chester Cup is a flat handicap horse race in Great Britain open to horses aged four years or older. It is run over a distance of 2 miles, 2 furlongs and 147 yards at Chester in May.

History
The event was established in 1824, and it was originally called the Tradesmen's Cup.

For a period the race was known as the Tradesmen's Plate. During this time it was open to horses aged three or older.

The race was renamed the Chester Trades' Cup in 1874. From this point it was often referred to as the Chester Cup, and that became its usual title in 1884.

The Chester Cup was formerly contested over 2 miles, 2 furlongs and 77 yards. It was abandoned in 1969, and extended by 20 yards in 1970.

The distance of the race was changed to 2 miles, 2 furlongs and 117 yards in 1992. It was increased to its present length in 1994.

Records

Most successful horse (2 wins):

 Leamington – 1857, 1859
 Dalby – 1865, 1866
 Pageant – 1877, 1878
 Dare Devil – 1892, 1893
 Chivalrous – 1922, 1923
 Sea Pigeon – 1977, 1978
 Top Cees – 1995, 1997
 Rainbow High – 1999, 2001
 Anak Pekan – 2004, 2005

Leading jockey (4 wins):
 Sam Darling – Independence (1831), Colwick (1832), Pickpocket (1833), Cardinal Puff (1839)
 Lester Piggott – Sandiacre (1958), Aegean Blue (1966), Major Rose (1968), John Cherry (1976)

Leading trainer (4 wins):
 Barry Hills – Arapahos (1980), Rainbow High (1999, 2001), Daraahem (2009)

Winners since 1975
 Weights given in stones and pounds.

Earlier winners

 1824: Doge of Venice
 1825: Hymettus
 1826: Brutandorf
 1827: Grenadier
 1828: Fylde
 1829: Halston
 1830: Felt
 1831: Independence
 1832: Colwick
 1833: Pickpocket
 1834: The Cardinal
 1835: Birdlime
 1836: Tanworth
 1837: General Chasse
 1838: King Cole
 1839: Cardinal Puff
 1840: Dey of Algiers
 1841: Cruiskeen
 1842: Alice Hawthorn
 1843: Millepede
 1844: Red Deer
 1845: Intrepid
 1846: Corranna
 1847: St Lawrence
 1848: Peep-o-Day-Boy
 1849: Malton
 1850: Mounseer
 1851: Nancy
 1852: Joe Miller
 1853: Goldfinder
 1854: Epaminondas
 1855: Scythian
 1856: One Act
 1857: Leamington
 1858: Vanity
 1859: Leamington
 1860: St Albans
 1861: Ben Webster
 1862: Tim Whiffler
 1863: Asteroid
 1864: Flash in the Pan
 1865: Dalby
 1866: Dalby
 1867: Beeswing
 1868: Paul Jones
 1869: Knight of the Garter
 1870: Our Mary Ann
 1871: Glenlivat
 1872: Inveresk
 1873: Field Marshal
 1874: Organist
 1875: Freeman
 1876: Tam o'Shanter
 1877: Pageant
 1878: Pageant
 1879: Reefer
 1880: Fashion
 1881: Windsor
 1882: Prudhomme
 1883: Biserta
 1884: Havock
 1885: Merry Prince
 1886: Eastern Emperor
 1887: Carlton
 1888: Kinsky
 1889: Mill Stream
 1890: Tyrant
 1891: Vasistas
 1892: Dare Devil
 1893: Dare Devil
 1894: Quaesitum
 1895: Kilsallaghan
 1896: The Rush
 1897: Count Schomberg
 1898: Up Guards
 1899: Uncle Mac
 1900: Roughside
 1901: David Garrick
 1902: Carabine
 1903: Vendale
 1904: Sandboy
 1905: Imari
 1906: Feather Bed
 1907: Querido
 1908: Glacis
 1909: Santo Strato
 1910: Elizabetta
 1911: Willonyx
 1912: Rathlea
 1913: The Guller
 1914: Aleppo
 1915: Hare Hill
 1916–18: no race
 1919: Tom Pepper
 1920: Our Stephen
 1921: no race
 1922: Chivalrous
 1923: Chivalrous
 1924: Rugeley
 1925: Spithead
 1926: Hidennis
 1927: Dark Japan
 1928: St Mary's Kirk
 1929: First Flight
 1930: Mountain Lad
 1931: Brown Jack
 1932: Bonny Brighteyes
 1933: Dick Turpin
 1934: Blue Vision
 1935: Damascus
 1936: Cho-sen
 1937: Faites vos Jeux
 1938: Mr Grundy
 1939: Winnebar
 1940–45:  no race
 1946: Retsel
 1947: Asmodee II
 1948: Billet
 1949: John Moore
 1950: Heron Bridge
 1951: Wood Leopard
 1952: Le Tellier
 1953: Eastern Emperor
 1954: Peperium
 1955: Prescription
 1956: Golovine
 1957: Curry
 1958: Sandiacre
 1959: Agreement
 1960: Trelawny
 1961: Hoy
 1962: Golden Fire
 1963: Narratus
 1964: Credo
 1965: Harvest Gold
 1966: Aegean Blue
 1967: Mahbub Aly
 1968: Major Rose
 1969: no race
 1970: Altogether
 1971: Random Shot
 1972: Eric
 1973: Crisalgo
 1974: Attivo

See also

 Horse racing in Great Britain
 List of British flat horse races
 Recurring sporting events established in 1824 – this race is included under its original title, Tradesmen's Cup.

References

 Paris-Turf:
, 
 Racing Post:

 galopp-sieger.de – Chester Cup.
 pedigreequery.com – Chester Cup – Chester.
 

Open long distance horse races
Chester Racecourse
Flat races in Great Britain
Recurring sporting events established in 1824
1824 establishments in England